Alhaji Amri Athumani (1 August 1948 - 8 August 2018 ) well known as Mzee Majuto was a Tanzanian comedian, actor, director, screenwriter and film producer.

Biography 
He studied at Msambweni secondary school located in Tanga Region. He started acting in 1958 (at the age of 9 to 10); at that time he was acting on the stages. mzee Majuto was featured in dozens of films including a franchise 'Siri ya Marehemu' starred by Mohamed Fungafunga alias 'Jengua'.

Treatment 
On April 28, 2018 Minister of information, arts and sports at a time, Harrison Mwakyembe visited Mzee Majuto at the Muhimbili National Hospital where he was being treated . On that day, Minister Mwakyembe announced the intention of the Tanzanian government to send Mzee Majuto to India for further treatment. Originally, King Majuto was reported to be suffering from Prostate cancer where he started his treatment in Tanzania . On May 1, Mzee Majuto was reportedly flown to India for further treatment.

He was treated in India until his health improved and he returned to Tanzania to continue his clinic at the Muhimbili National hospital.

Death 
Mzee Majuto was reported to be overwhelmed, a situation that led to his re-admission to Muhimbili National Hospital in the intensive care unit ( ICU ). He was pronounced dead on August 8, 2018 at two o'clock in the night in the wards of Mwaisera, in Muhimbili national hospital. He was buried at his hometown in Tanga Region.

References

External links 
Mzee Majuto at Bongo Cinema

1948 births
2018 deaths
Tanzanian male film actors
Male comedians
Tanzanian male actors
People from Tanga Region